Defying the Rules is Hibria's first album, released in 2004. It tells the story of a dystopian future, ruled over by the 'Faceless in Charge' and group of rebels, such as the 'Steel Lord' battling against his forces for a free world.

Track listing
 "Intro"  – 1:56
 "Steel Lord on Wheels"  – 3:54
 "Change Your Life Line"  – 4:25
 "Millennium Quest"  – 6:51
 "A Kingdom to Share"  – 5:37
 "Living Under Ice"  – 3:45
 "Defying the Rules"  – 5:49
 "The Faceless in Charge"  – 6:58
 "High Speed Breakout"  – 5:01
 "Stare at Yourself"  – 7:45
 "Hard Ride"  – 3:48 (Pantera cover) (Japanese reissue only)
 "Painted Skies"  – 5:14 (Crimson Glory cover) (Japanese reissue only)

Credits
Iuri Sanson - Vocals
Diego Kasper - Guitars, Synth programming
Abel Camargo - Guitars
Marco Panichi - Bass
Savio Sordi - drums
Piet Sielck - Mixing and Mastering

Note
The instrumental Intro track is not present on all versions of the album.

2004 albums